Arez is a former civil parish in the municipality of Nisa, Portugal. The population in 2011 was 256, in an area of 55.72 km2. On 28 January 2013, the parish merged with Amieira do Tejo to form the new parish of Arez e Amieira do Tejo.

Population

References

Former parishes of Nisa, Portugal